James Bysse Joll FBA (21 June 1918 – 12 July 1994) was a British historian and university lecturer whose works included The Origins of the First World War and Europe Since 1870. He also wrote on the history of anarchism and socialism.

Life and career
Joll was born on 21 June 1918 in Bristol and was educated at Winchester, the University of Bordeaux and New College, Oxford. He left to join the British Army in 1940, eventually serving in the Special Operations Executive. He returned to Oxford after World War II, completed his studies, and became an instructor there. He was a Fellow and Tutor in Politics from 1947 until 1950. He then transferred to St Antony's College. In 1955 he met the painter and art historian John Golding; the two men formed a long relationship which lasted until Joll's death.

While at Oxford, Joll wrote a book on the Second International (1955) and a book on Léon Blum, Walter Rathenau, and Filippo Tommaso Marinetti, called Intellectuals in Politics (1960). In 1964 he published The Anarchists, which showed his intertwined interests in the culture, events, political philosophy, and individual personalities forming the history of a Leftist movement.

In 1967 Joll left St Antony's, Oxford to teach at the London School of Economics, as the Stevenson Professor of International History. His best known work was Europe Since 1870: an International History, which appeared in 1973. He returned to biography in 1977, with his book on Italian Marxist intellectual Antonio Gramsci; he was elected a Fellow of the British Academy in the same year. Several prizes in the Department of International History at the London School of Economics remain named in his honour. Later, he gave refuge to Anthony Blunt, Golding's colleague at the Courtauld Institute and former teacher, after Blunt's exposure as a former Soviet spy, for which Joll was attacked in the press.

Following his retirement in 1981, he became Emeritus Professor of the University of London.

Joll died 12 July 1994 from the cancer of the larynx. In his obituary notice for The Independent newspaper, the historian Sir Michael Howard, noted:Joll's real focus was the history of ideas broadly conceived – philosophical, ethical and aesthetic, as well as political – and the interface between this and the political history of Europe in the 19th and 20th centuries. He firmly believed that history was made by people rather than by dispassionate forces. But he also believed that one could not understand why people act as they do unless one also understands the influences that moulded their minds.

Works

References 
Notes

Bibliography

1918 births
1994 deaths
English historians
Fellows of the British Academy
British Army personnel of World War II
British Special Operations Executive personnel
Alumni of New College, Oxford
Academics of the London School of Economics
Academics of the University of London
Fellows of St Antony's College, Oxford
English LGBT writers
People educated at Winchester College
Devonshire Regiment officers
English biographers
University of Bordeaux alumni
20th-century biographers
English male non-fiction writers
Historians of anarchism
20th-century English male writers
British expatriates in France